The  Virginia Destroyers season was the second and final season for the United Football League franchise and the fourth in the combined history of the Destroyers and its predecessor, the Florida Tuskers.

Personnel

Staff

Roster

Schedule

Standings

References

Virginia Destroyers seasons
Virginia Destroyers
Virginia Destroyers